Kevin Alexander Russo (born July 8, 1984) is a former professional baseball player. He played in Major League Baseball (MLB) for the New York Yankees in 2010.

Early years
Russo attended Fairview High School in Boulder, Colorado.  As a running back on the Fairview High School football team, Russo rushed for 2,416 yards during his senior year, leading the team to a state title.  He and LenDale White were named as the two all-state running backs by the Rocky Mountain News.

He attended San Jacinto College before transferring to Baylor University.  At Baylor, he helped the Baylor Bears baseball team reach the 2005 College World Series. In 2005, he played collegiate summer baseball with the Wareham Gatemen of the Cape Cod Baseball League.

Professional career

New York Yankees
Russo was drafted by the Yankees in the 20th round (614th overall) of the 2006 Major League Baseball draft. Following the 2009 season, Russo was added to the 40-man roster to protect him from the Rule 5 draft. He was called up to the major leagues for the first time on May 8, 2010. He recorded his first hit in the Majors on May 21, 2010 in an interleague game against the New York Mets and added the decisive two-run double later in the game to lead the Yankees to a 2–1 win over the Mets.

The Yankees designated him for assignment on May 6, 2011, to make room for Jess Todd on the 40-man roster.

Detroit Tigers
On November 18, 2012, Russo signed a minor league deal with the Detroit Tigers with an invitation to spring training. Russo spent the 2013 season with the Toledo Mud Hens and was resigned for the 2014 season but was cut in spring training and did not appear in a game in the 2014 season.

Sugar Land Skeeters
Russo signed with the Sugar Land Skeeters of the Atlantic League of Professional Baseball for the 2015 season. He became a free agent after the 2015 season.

References

External links

1984 births
Living people
New York Yankees players
Baylor Bears baseball players
Major League Baseball second basemen
People from West Babylon, New York
Gulf Coast Yankees players
Tampa Yankees players
Trenton Thunder players
Scranton/Wilkes-Barre Yankees players
Baseball players from New York (state)
Toledo Mud Hens players
Peoria Javelinas players
Sugar Land Skeeters players
Wareham Gatemen players